Albert Popov (born 8 August 1997) is a Bulgarian alpine skier.

Career
Albert Popov was born in Sofia and made his debut in the FIS Alpine Ski World Cup in 2014, aged just 17. A few months later, he participated at the 2015 FIS Alpine World Ski Championships, where he failed to finish both the slalom and giant slalom events.

Popov was involved in a serious car accident on 17 November 2015, while returning from training near Sölden. He was one of two passengers in a vehicle driven by Drago Grubelnik, then head coach of the Bulgarian ski team, who was also accompanied by his assistant Mitko Hristov. All three occupants of the car were injured in the crash, with Grubelnik later dying of his wounds in a hospital in Murnau, Germany. Popov eventually returned to the FIS circuit for the 2016–17 season and featured at the 2017 World Championships, where he finished 27th overall in slalom and 30th overall in the giant slalom event.

On 6 February 2018, Popov won a bronze medal in the giant slalom at the 2018 FIS Junior World Ski Championships in Davos. Twelve days later, he made his debut at the Winter Olympics in Pyeongchang 2018, where he placed 28th in the giant slalom and did not finish the slalom.

His World Cup breakthrough came in the opening race of the 2018–19 season in Levi, where he finished 20th, earning 11 points - Bulgaria's first in the World Cup since Petar Popangelov during the 1986–87 season. Popov followed that up with a 16th place finish at Madonna di Campiglio in December, after starting with the number 72 bib. On 26 January 2019, he finished 9th in the slalom event at Kitzbühel, which was the best result for a Bulgarian skier since Popangelov placed 7th at Heavenly Valley in 1985–86. Three days later he reached another milestone, finishing 6th at Schladming, his country's highest placement since Popangelov's 6th place at Park City during the 1984–85 season.

Popov scored his first World Cup points of the 2019–20 season on 15 December 2019, when he finished 12th in the slalom at Val-d'Isère. On 8 January 2020, he took 18th place in the slalom at Madonna di Campiglio, his second consecutive points finish at that event. Four days later he finished 13th in the slalom at Adelboden. On 28 January 2020, Popov finished 19th during the slalom event at Schladming, equaling his season's best of four point placements.

World Cup results

Season standings

Top 10 finishes 

Standings as of 26 February 2023

World Championships results

Olympic results

References

External links
 

1997 births
Living people
Sportspeople from Sofia
Bulgarian male alpine skiers
Alpine skiers at the 2018 Winter Olympics
Alpine skiers at the 2022 Winter Olympics
Olympic alpine skiers of Bulgaria